Medford Knife and Tool is an American custom and production knifemaking and tactical tool making facility founded by Greg Medford in 2010 in Arizona United States.

The company 
The company was founded in Arizona, United States, by Greg Medford. Unlike most knife makers who start out as a home-based business, Medford opened a modern factory, complete with CAD and CNC milling machines. The knives are made in the US and most of the work is done by hand as opposed to automated machining. The company mainly produces folding knives, but at the same time it produces fixed blades knives and tactical tools such as Tomahawks, machetes and Steel knuckles.
A knife model called the "Praetorian" is considered the company's most recognized knife.

Products 

The company's knives and tools feature minimal design elements and clean lines, a massive structure, and a combination of grinds and some describe them as overbuilt. Some knives models are combined with tool elements, such as screwdriver heads or glass breaker. Knife blades are usually made from D-2 Steel, CPM-S35VN Stainless steel and CPM3V Steel, for handles the company uses titanium, G-10, carbon fiber, or a Paracord.

Cooperation with military units 
The USMC EOD-1 model was designed in collaboration with the US Marines according to their requirements. The TM-1 machete was designed according to the requirements of international security services companies.

Controversies 
There have been several times in which Greg Medford has had voiced his racist, sexist and homophobic remarks.

On 14 June 2022, he was giving out shirts at the Blade Show with the phrase "Don't buy Chi-Com Knifes" along with 2 sterotyopical asians saying "You want to buy a Chi-Torian" and "Fan-yoo".

In response in a later deleted he stood by his claims on his shirt and his IP being stolen by Chinese companies.

On his podcast he quite often makes sexist, racist and homophobic remarks.

References

Knife manufacturing companies
Manufacturing companies based in Phoenix, Arizona
American companies established in 2010
Manufacturing companies established in 2010
2010 establishments in Arizona